CWF may refer to:

Championship Wrestling from Florida, a defunct Florida-based professional wrestling promotion
Continental Wrestling Federation, a defunct Tennessee and Alabama-based professional wrestling promotion
CWF, the IATA and FAA LID code for Chennault International Airport, Louisiana, United States
CWF, the National Rail station code for Canary Wharf railway station, London, England